Elections to the European Parliament were held in Belgium on 18 June 1989. The Dutch-speaking electoral college elected 13 MEPs and the French-speaking electoral college elected 11 MEPs.

The first election to the newly established Brussels Regional Council was held on the same day.

Results

Belgium
European Parliament elections in Belgium
1989 elections in Belgium